Willseyville is a hamlet in Tioga County, New York, United States. Willseyville has a post office with ZIP code 13864, which opened on December 8, 1827.

References

Hamlets in Tioga County, New York
Hamlets in New York (state)